Andrew Chalmers is a New Zealand ex rugby league player, businessman and ex owner of the Bradford Bulls rugby club along with Graham Lowe Chalmers is also the ex chairman of New Zealand Rugby League As of 2021 he is in the process of creating a second team, the revived Wellington Orcas for the NZRL.

Rugby career 
After studying at Massey University, he  joined a rugby league  Wainuiomata team.

Chalmers was a back-rower who converted to a fullback. At a New Zealand Maori tournament he was recruited by an Australian team St. George Dragons. He trained with St. George Dragons in 1992 before joining Manly.

He played reserve grade at Manly and at the Balmain Tigers before he broke his arm twice and broke his thumb.

Business career 
Chalmers has a bachelor's in marketing and honours' and master's degrees in finance from Massey University, additionally he worked as an associate lecturer at the University of New South Wales.

After his time playing Rugby league he spend seven years in Sydney  as a CEO of a travel company with 550 staff and an annual revenue of $A280 million. Chalmers went on to work as the CEO of New Zealand forestry companies Harvest Pro and Kiwi Forestry.

Chalmers also works as the executive director of Pango New Zealand. Additionally along with Graham Lowe he later purchased the English rugby club the Bradford Bulls and founded the recruitment agency Lowie Recruitment.

References 

New Zealand rugby league players
Year of birth missing (living people)
Living people